Calycomyza lantanae is a species of leaf miner fly in the family Agromyzidae. It is found in Africa.

References

Agromyzidae
Articles created by Qbugbot
Insects described in 1956